Boris Babic (born 10 November 1997) is a Swiss professional football player of Serbian descent who plays as a forward for Lugano.

Club career
Babic made his professional debut in the Swiss Super League for FC St. Gallen on 10 December 2016 in a game against FC Basel.

On 5 July 2022, Babic signed a three-year contract with Lugano.

International career
He participated in the 2014 UEFA European Under-17 Championship with the Switzerland national under-17 football team.

Honours
FC Vaduz
Liechtenstein Football Cup: 2017–18

References

External links
 

1997 births
Swiss people of Serbian descent
People from Walenstadt
Sportspeople from the canton of St. Gallen
Living people
Swiss men's footballers
Association football forwards
Switzerland youth international footballers
FC St. Gallen players
FC Biel-Bienne players
FC Vaduz players
FC Lugano players
Swiss Promotion League players
Swiss Challenge League players
Swiss 1. Liga (football) players
Swiss Super League players
Swiss expatriate footballers
Swiss expatriate sportspeople in Liechtenstein
Expatriate footballers in Liechtenstein